This is a list of the 67 episodes of the BBC TV sitcom As Time Goes By, starring Judi Dench and Geoffrey Palmer, broadcast between 12 January 1992 and 30 December 2005. With the exception of the final three episodes, all episodes are 30 minutes long.

Series overview

Episodes

Series 1 (1992)

Series 2 (1993)

Series 3 (1994)

Series 4 (1995)

Series 5 (1996)

Series 6 (1997)

Series 7 (1998)

Series 8 (2000)

Series 9 (2002)

The Reunion Specials (2005)

In December 2020, when rebroadcasting the series, UKTV spilt the 2 specials from 2005 into 4 episodes airing them as 'Christmas Specials series 10'. A 'last time' and 'next time' compilation was added at the start and end of each episode.

References

External links

BBC-related lists
As Time Goes By
As Time Goes By